The New Jersey Senate is the upper house of the New Jersey Legislature by the Constitution of 1844, replacing the Legislative Council. There are 40 legislative districts, representing districts with an average population of 232,225 (2020 figure). Each district has one senator and two members of the New Jersey General Assembly, the lower house of the legislature. Prior to the election in which they are chosen, senators must be a minimum of 30 years old and a resident of the state for four years to be eligible to serve in office.

From 1844 until 1965 (when the Reynolds v. Sims US Supreme Court decision mandated all state legislators be elected from districts of roughly equal population), each county was an electoral district electing one senator. Under the 1844 Constitution, the term of office was three years, which was changed to four years with the 1947 Constitution. Since 1968 the Senate has consisted of 40 senators, who are elected in a "2-4-4" cycle. Senators serve a two-year term at the beginning of each decade, with the rest of the decade divided into two four-year terms. The "2-4-4" cycle was put into place so that Senate elections can reflect the changes made to the district boundaries on the basis of the decennial United States Census. If the cycle were not put into place, then the boundaries would sometimes be four years out of date before being used for Senate elections. Rather, with the varied term, the boundaries are only two years out of date. Thus elections for Senate seats take place in years ending with a "1", "3", or "7" (i.e. next elections in 2023, 2027, and 2031).

Interim appointments are made to fill vacant legislative seats by the county committee or committees of the party of the vacating person (since a constitutional amendment passed on November 8, 1988). The office is on the ballot for the next general election, even if the other Senate seats are not up for election in that year (such as in years ending with a "5" or "9", such as 2009 or 2015). The sole exception to this is if the vacancy occurred within 51 days of the election, in which case the appointment stands until the following general election.

Senatorial courtesy

Senatorial courtesy is a senate tradition that allows home county legislators to intercede to prevent consideration of a local resident nominated by the Governor for a position that requires Senate confirmation. Any of the senators from the nominee's home county can invoke senatorial courtesy to block a nomination, temporarily or permanently, without any obligation to justify the basis of their actions.

Governor Corzine nominated Stuart Rabner on June 4, 2007, to be the next Chief Justice of the New Jersey Supreme Court, replacing James R. Zazzali, who was nearing mandatory retirement age. Shortly after the nomination, two members of the Senate from Essex County, where Rabner resides, blocked consideration of his confirmation by invoking senatorial courtesy. State Senator Ronald Rice had initially blocked the nomination, but relented on June 15, 2007, after a meeting with the governor. Nia Gill dropped her block on June 19, 2007, but did not explain the nature of her concerns, though anonymous lawmakers cited in The New York Times indicated that the objection was due to Rabner's race and Governor Corzine's failure to consider a minority candidate for the post.

Also in June 2007, Loretta Weinberg used senatorial courtesy privileges to hold up consideration of a new term in office for Bergen County Prosecutor John Molinelli.

Acting governor
Until 2010, in the event of a gubernatorial vacancy, the New Jersey Constitution had specified that the President of the Senate (followed by the Speaker of the New Jersey General Assembly) would assume the role of Acting Governor and retain their role in the Senate (or Assembly). An Acting Governor would then assume the governorship while retaining the reins of power in their house of the legislature.

The Lieutenant Governor of New Jersey took office for the first time on January 19, 2010, following a conjoint election with the Governor of New Jersey. The position was created as the result of a Constitutional amendment to the New Jersey State Constitution passed by the voters on November 8, 2005.  While the amendment itself took effect as of January 17, 2006, and made some interim changes to the succession to the governorship, the first lieutenant governor was not elected until November 3, 2009.

Composition

List of state senators

Committees and committee chairs
Committee chairs for the 2018–2019 Legislative Session are:
 Budget and Appropriations - Paul Sarlo (D-Wood-Ridge)
 Commerce - Nellie Pou (D-North Haledon)
 Community and Urban Affairs - Troy Singleton (D-Palmyra)
 Economic Growth - Nilsa Cruz-Perez (D-Barrington)
 Education - Vin Gopal (D-Long Branch)
 Environment and Energy - Bob Smith (D-Piscataway)
 Health, Human Services and Senior Citizens - Joe F. Vitale (D-Woodbridge Township)
 Higher Education - Sandra Bolden Cunningham (D-Jersey City)
 Judiciary - Brian P. Stack (D-Union City)
 Labor - Fred H. Madden (D-Washington Township, Gloucester County)
 Law and Public Safety - Linda R. Greenstein (D-Plainsboro Township)
 Legislative Oversight - Richard J. Codey (D-Roseland)
 Military and Veterans' Affairs - Joseph Cryan (D-Union Township)
 Rules and Order - TBD
 Select Committee on School Funding Fairness - TBD
 State Government, Wagering, Tourism & Historic Preservation - James Beach (D-Voorhees Township)
 Transportation - Patrick J. Diegnan (D-South Plainfield)

List of Senate presidents

The following is a list of presidents of the New Jersey Senate since the adoption of the 1844 State Constitution:

 1845–1848: John C. Smallwood, Gloucester
 1849–1850: Ephraim March, Morris
 1851: Silas D. Canfield, Passaic
 1852: John Manners, Hunterdon
 1853–1856: William C. Alexander, Mercer
 1857–1858: Henry V. Speer, Middlesex
 1859: Thomas H. Herring, Bergen
 1860: Charles L. C. Gifford, Essex
 1861: Edmund Perry, Hunterdon
 1862: Joseph T. Crowell, Union
 1863: Anthony Reckless, Monmouth
 1864: Amos Robbins, Middlesex
 1865: Edward W. Scudder, Mercer
 1866: James M. Scovel, Camden
 1867: Benjamin Buckley, Passaic
 1868–1869: Henry S. Little, Monmouth
 1870: Amos Robbins
 1871–1872: Edward Bettle, Camden
 1873–1875: John W. Taylor, Essex
 1876: William J. Sewell, Camden
 1877: Leon Abbett, Hudson
 1878: George C. Ludlow, Middlesex
 1879–1880: William J. Sewell
 1881–1882: Garret Hobart, Passaic
 1883: John J. Gardner, Atlantic
 1884: Benjamin A. Vail, Union
 1885: Abraham V. Schenck, Middlesex
 1886: John W. Griggs, Passaic
 1887: Frederick S. Fish, Essex
 1888: George H. Large, Hunterdon
 1889: George T. Werts, Morris
 1890: Henry M. Nevius, Monmouth
 1891–1893: Robert Adrain, Middlesex
 1894: Maurice A. Rogers, Camden
 1895: Edward C. Stokes, Cumberland
 1896: Lewis A. Thompson, Somerset (resigned March 30)
 1896–1897: Robert Williams, Passaic
 1898: Foster M. Voorhees, Union (became Acting Governor February 1)
 1898: William H. Skirm (pro tem), Mercer
 1899: Charles A. Reed, Somerset
 1900: William M. Johnson, Bergen
 1901: Mahlon Pitney, Morris
 1902: Charles Asa Francis, Monmouth
 1903: Elijah C. Hutchinson, Mercer
 1904: Edmund W. Wakelee, Bergen
 1905: Joseph Cross, Union (resigned March 30)
 1905–1906: William J. Bradley, Camden
 1907: Bloomfield H. Minch, Cumberland
 1908: Thomas J. Hillery, Morris
 1909: Samuel K. Robbins, Burlington (resigned April 16)
 1909–1910: Joseph S. Frelinghuysen, Somerset
 1911: Ernest R. Ackerman, Union
 1912: John Dyneley Prince, Passaic
 1913: James F. Fielder, Hudson (became Acting Governor March 1)
 1913: James A. C. Johnson (pro tem), Bergen
 1914: John W. Slocum, Monmouth
 1915: Walter E. Edge, Atlantic
 1916: William T. Read, Camden (resigned March 29)
 1916–1917: George W. F. Gaunt, Gloucester
 1918: Thomas F. McCran, Passaic
 1919: William N. Runyon, Union
 1920: Clarence E. Case, Somerset
 1921: Collins B. Allen, Salem
 1922: William B. Mackay Jr., Bergen
 1923: Joseph F. Wallworth, Camden
 1924: Firman M. Reeves, Cumberland
 1925: William H. Bright, Cape May
 1926: Morgan F. Larson, Middlesex
 1927: Francis B. Davis, Gloucester
 1928: William A. Stevens, Monmouth
 1929: Thomas A. Mathis, Ocean
 1930: Arthur N. Pierson, Union
 1931: Joseph G. Wolber, Essex
 1932: A. Crozer Reeves, Mercer
 1933: Emerson Lewis Richards, Atlantic
 1934: Clifford R. Powell, Burlington
 1935: Horace G. Prall, Hunterdon
 1936: John C. Barbour, Passaic (resigned June 26)
 1936–1937: Frank Durand, Monmouth
 1938: Charles E. Loizeaux, Union
 1939: Robert C. Hendrickson, Gloucester
 1940: Arthur F. Foran, Hunterdon
 1941–1942: I. Grant Scott, Cape May
 1943: George H. Stanger, Cumberland
 1944: Howard Eastwood, Burlington (resigned August 31)
 1944: George H. Stanger
 1945: Frank S. Farley, Atlantic
 1946: Haydn Proctor, Monmouth
 1947: Charles K. Barton, Passaic
 1948: John M. Summerill Jr., Salem
 1949: David Van Alstyne, Bergen
 1950: Samuel L. Bodine, Hunterdon
 1951: Alfred B. Littell, Sussex
 1952: Harold W. Hannold, Gloucester
 1953: David Young III, Morris
 1954: W. Steelman Mathis, Ocean
 1955: Bruce A. Wallace, Camden
 1956: Wayne Dumont Jr., Warren
 1957: Albert McCay, Burlington
 1958: Richard R. Stout, Monmouth
 1959: Wesley L. Lance, Hunterdon
 1960: George B. Harper, Sussex
 1961: Thomas J. Hillery, Morris
 1962: Robert C. Crane, Union (resigned January 9)
 1962: Frank S. Farley
 1963: William E. Ozzard, Somerset
 1964–1965: Charles W. Sandman, Cape May
 1966: John A. Lynch Sr., 7th District
 1967: Sido L. Ridolfi, 6th District
 1968: Edwin B. Forsythe, 4B District
 1969: Frank X. McDermott, 9th District
 1970–1972:  Raymond Bateman, 8th District
 1973: Alfred N. Beadleston, 5th District
 1974–1975: Frank J. Dodd, 26th District
 1976–1977: Matthew Feldman, 37th District
 1978–1981: Joseph P. Merlino, 13th District
 1982–1986: Carmen A. Orechio, 30th District
 1986–1990: John F. Russo, 10th District
 1990–1991: John A. Lynch Jr., 17th District
 1992–2002: Donald DiFrancesco, 22nd District
 2002–2004: John O. Bennett, 12th District and Richard Codey, 27th District (co-presidents, with the Senate split 20-20)
 2004–2008: Richard Codey, 27th District (resigned January 7, 2008)
 2008: Bernard Kenny, 33rd District (served January 7 to January 8, after Codey resigned to honor Kenny)
 2008–2010: Richard Codey, 27th District
 2010–2022: Stephen Sweeney, 3rd District; he was the longest-serving Senate President.
 2022–present Nicholas Scutari, 22nd District

Past composition

References

External links
New Jersey Legislature Homepage
New Jersey Senate Bill Search
New Jersey section of Project Vote Smart a national database of voting records and other information about legislators.
Senate Democratic Office
Senate Republican Office

New Jersey Legislature
State upper houses in the United States